In the District of Columbia, the slave trade was legal from its creation until it was outlawed as part of the Compromise of 1850. That restrictions on slavery in the District were probably coming was a major factor in the retrocession of the Virginia part of the District back to Virginia in 1847. Thus the large slave-trading businesses in Alexandria, such as Franklin & Armfield, could continue their operations in Virginia, where slavery was more secure.

Ownership of enslaved people remained legal in the District. It was not until the departure of the legislators from the seceding states that Congress could pass in 1862 the District of Columbia Compensated Emancipation Act. The Act provided partial compensation, up to $300 per slave, to slave owners. It was paid from general federal funds. Even though the compensation was small, as before the war a productive slave was worth much more than $300, it is the only place in the United States where slave owners received any compensation at all for freeing their slaves. Some slave owners, rather than manumitting (freeing) their enslaved workers for this small compensation, took them to Maryland and sold them there, which was completely legal.

Abolitionists nationally, led politically by Massachusetts Representative and former President John Quincy Adams, focused on slavery in the District. According to them, as they explained at length and repeatedly, under the Constitution, Congress had full control over the laws of the District, including laws regarding slavery. States' rights had nothing to do with it. As the powerful Southern legislators realized, and they had blocked it for this reason, it was the first step toward making slavery—according to them, a positive good—illegal in the entire country. The Emancipation Proclamation came 5 months after slavery ended in the District.

The drive to eliminate slavery in the District of Columbia was a major component in the anti-slavery campaign that led to the Civil War. Congress, under the leadership of former president John Quincy Adams, now Representative from strongly anti-slavery Massachusetts, was flooded with many petitions for action on the subject. They passed the gag rules, automatically tabling the petitions and preventing them from being read, discussed, or printed. Rather than resolving anything, these rules outraged Northerners and contributed to the growing polarization of the country over slavery.

Census
According to the decennial census, the number of enslaved in the District grew from 1800 to 1820, and then began a decline in raw numbers and an even faster decline in percentage. In the U.S. Census of 1820, the population of the District (33,039) was 67% white (22,614), 12% "free colored" (4,038), and 19% enslaved (6,377). In that of 1850, Alexandria no longer being in the District, 73% were white (37,941), 19% "free colored" (10,059), and 7% enslaved (3,687). In that of 1860 the percentages are 81% white (75,080), 15% "free colored" (11,131), and 4% enslaved (3,185).

Beginnings
When the District of Columbia was created in 1801, slavery was legal in the two states from whose territory the District was created, Maryland and Virginia. Slavery remained legal in the District, as no steps were taken to ban it. Enslaved workers built the White House, the U.S. Capitol, and other Washington buildings, in addition to clearing land and grading streets. Except under Presidents John Adams and his son John Quincy Adams, slaves served in the White House.

The campaign to ban slavery in the District
It was part of the American political wisdom of the Antebellum period, believed in by Abraham Lincoln along with many others, that, according to the Tenth Amendment to the Constitution, slavery in the United States was a state matter, Each state could determine whether slavery was permitted, and make such laws to govern the enslaved and the slave trade as it saw fit. According to the Constitution, Article 1, Section 9, they could "import...such Persons as any of the States now existing shall think proper to admit", but only until 1808, in the only restriction on slavery the framers of the Constitution could agree on. While the federal government could have regulated the extensive interstate commerce in enslaved people that emerged after 1808, there was not support for this in Congress, controlled by Southerners until 1861. Abolitionists wanted to abolish slavery altogether, not just the interstate trade.

Discussion focused on two questions. The first was whether new states made out of the western territories of the Louisiana Purchase and the formerly Mexican Southwest would be free or slave. This question was never resolved until 1861. It produced the guerrilla warfare of the Bleeding Kansas period, when Kansas had simultaneously two governments, in two cities, with two proposed constitutions, one slave and the other free, each claiming to be the only legitimate government of the entire Territory. This was the dress rehearsal, the Tragic Prelude, led by "old" John Brown, to the Civil War. Although the Free Soil partisans opposing slavery in Kansas succeeded, after much bloodshed and commotion and a federal investigation, in making it clear that the vast majority of Kansans wanted the state to be free, the Southern bloc that controlled Congress did not allow this. Kansas entered the Union as a free state within days after enough seceding Southern legislators withdrew for it to pass.

The other question, less known today (2020), was how to get rid of slavery in the places where it still existed. Aside from the remote Utah Territory, the only place in the country where slavery existed, but was not a state, was the District of Columbia. The federal government had full control over the District of Columbia. States' rights had nothing to do with it. Thus abolitionists focused on it. Slavery was most vulnerable there.

First attempts
"In 1805 Mr. Sloan of New Jersey offered [in the House of Representatives] a resolution moving the emancipation of slaves in the District at a certain age. The motion to refer it to a committee was voted down by sixty-five to forty-seven. Without any discussion, the resolution was voted on and lost by seventy-seven to thirty-one."

In 1828, citizens of the District petitioned unsuccessfully for gradual emancipation.

On the front page of the first issue of The Liberator
William Lloyd Garrison began, on January 1, 1831, what would be the principal organ and community bulletin board of the American abolitionist movement, The Liberator. The first article on the front page was his complaint that the

He followed with the text of a petition to Congress, and gave  readers the address of the Boston bookstore where a copy could be signed.

The second article in the new newspaper examined "The Slave Trade in the Capital".

Snow riot (1835) and Reuben Crandall trial (1836)

Dr. Reuben Crandall, after a jury trial, was acquitted of the charge of distributing abolitionist literature in the District, which was a crime under federal law. The trial was the biggest criminal trial in the District up to that date, attended by multiple reporters and congressmen. The testimony was quickly published, and reveals much about slave life in the District at that moment. From it we learn, for example, that police doubled as slave catchers; regardless of any support slave owners were legally entitled to receive, as a practical matter they hired slave-catchers to apprehend fugitives, offering rewards for their return.

Francis Scott Key, author of The Star-Spangled Banner, was a slave owner and a defender of slavery. In his position as U.S. Attorney for the District of Columbia, he was in charge of criminal prosecutions in the District, all of which prosecutions were for violations of federal law, as no state law was relevant. Shortly after Crandall's opening an office in Georgetown, slave catchers reported him for possession of abolitionist literature, and Key wrote a lengthy indictment, charging him with "seditious libel and inciting slaves and free blacks to revolt".

Key thought he would gain politically by "finally doing something about the abolitionists". Reuben's sister, Prudence Crandall, had set up the first school for Black girls in the country, the Canterbury Female Boarding School, which aroused such violent opposition from white townspeople that she was forced to close it out of concern for the students' safety. However, the defense produced evidence that Reuben had quite different opinions from his sister, and had been confused with an abolitionist of similar name. A jury found him "not guilty" on all counts. Key was publicly humiliated, and it hurt his career.

Bail had been set so high for Reuben that he could not met it, and he remained in the dank Washington jail for over six months. He contracted tuberculosis there, and died not long after his release.

Slave pens

Petition campaign

Gag rule (1836–1844)

Overwhelmed with the number of petitions arriving, the House of Representatives set up a Select Committee to consider what to do, headed by Rep. Henry L. Pinckney of South Carolina. The Committee endorsed the House's existing position that Congress had no authority to interfere in any way with slavery in the District of Columbia, or in any state. So that "the agitation of this subject should be finally arrested", it recommended that "all petitions, memorials, resolutions, propositions, or papers, relating in any way, or to any extent whatever, to the subject of slavery, or the abolition of slavery, shall, without being either printed or referred, be laid upon the table, and that no further action whatever shall be had thereon". It passed by a vote of 117 to 68. This and subsequent, related gag orders were repealed in 1844.

Massachusetts and Vermont call for Congress to act
In March of 1840, both houses of the Legislature of Massachusetts passed a group of "Resolves" (Resolutions) calling for Congress to use its Constitutional authority and immediately end slavery and the slave trade in the District, and prohibit interstate commerce in enslaved persons. This was then the official position of the Commonwealth of Massachusetts. The Commonwealth also went on record as opposing the admission of any new slave states.

Garrison, who reproduced the now-rare pamphlet on the front page of his newspaper The Liberator, described this as a victory, the first time any government anywhere in the United States had taken an official position calling for the immediate abolition of slavery. Vermont promptly followed Massachusetts' example.

Virginia retrocession (1847)

Pearl incident (1848)

Prohibition of the slave trade (1850)
As part of the Compromise of 1850, slave trading was prohibited in Washington DC, but slave ownership was not.  The residents of the capitol could still own slaves and trade for them in the nearby states of Virginia and Maryland.

District of Columbia Compensated Emancipation Act (1862)

Slave owners complained that emancipation of their enslaved workers would deprive them of their property; "property rights" are a euphemism for slavery in speeches of the period. Compensated emancipation, in which owners were to be compensated by a government for the loss of their "property", had been discussed at length in the 1840s and 1850s and part of England's liberation of its Caribbean slaves. This changed from an idea to a real possibility after Southern senators and representatives abandoned the U.S. Congress in 1861, and Lincoln became president. With Congress's support, he proposed it to the Union slave states, also called border states, of Missouri, Kentucky, Maryland, and Delaware. These states did not agree to any emancipation proposal, compensated or not. Maryland freed its enslaved in 1864, and Missouri early in 1865, but those in  Delaware and Kentucky were not liberated until the national ratification of the 13th Amendment in December 1865, seven months after the end of the Civil War. Delaware symbolically ratified the 13th Amendment in 1901, and Kentucky in 1975.

The only place compensated emancipation was put into practice in the United States was in the District of Columbia. Under the District of Columbia Compensated Emancipation Act, passed by Congress and signed by Lincoln in 1862, slavery was prohibited in the District, the federal government compensated owners up to $300 per freed person, and detailed records exist for each claim and payment. This maximum amount was much less than an able male slave could have been sold for before the war, if taken to Maryland or Virginia and sold there, as many were. However, the value of an enslaved person declined after the beginning of the Civil War, when transport of enslaved people from northern slave "producers" (Maryland and Virginia) to Southern plantation owners became impossible. The looming possibility of uncompensated abolition also depressed the value of slaves.

The day Lincoln signed the bill, April 16, 1862, is celebrated in the District as Emancipation Day, a legal holiday since 2005.

See also
Abolitionism in the United States
Charlotte Dupuy
District of Columbia Compensated Emancipation Act (1862), which ended slavery in Washington, D.C
Emancipation Day § District of Columbia
John Quincy Adams and abolitionism
List of slave owners
Slavery in the United States
Treatment of slaves in the United States

References

Further reading

This listing does not include publications already cited in references.

1827

1828

1829

1830

1831

1834
  Petitions to Congress for Abolishing Slavery in the District of Columbia (pp. 10–12). Reproduces (p. 17) District advertisements offering to buy or sell slaves, and (pp. 18–23) surveys the slave jails or warehouses in the District. Discusses forced family separations, and the sale of free Blacks to pay jail fees. Letters of Wm. Lloyd Garrison and others. The last page is a petition to be torn out, signed, and sent to Congress, asking for the elimination of Slavery in the District.

1836
 Also in Register of debates in Congress, comprising the leading debates and incidents of the second session of the Eighteenth Congress: [Dec. 6, 1824, to the first session of the Twenty-fifth Congress, Oct. 16, 1837] together with an appendix, containing the most important state papers and public documents to which the session has given birth: to which are added, the laws enacted during the session, with a copious index to the whole .

1837

1838

 There was another edition in 1838, and since it can be pinpointed as appearing in February of 1838, it must have been the first of the two. Its title was The Power of Congress over the District of Columbia, originally published in the New-York Evening Post, under the signature of "Wythe." With additions by the author. No publisher is given, merely a printer; it was presumably printed at Weld's expense. The articles by "Wythe" in the Post appeared in the issues of December 29, 30, 1837, and January 2, 12, 22, and 30, 1838.

1839
 Abraham Lincoln, at that time a member of the Illinois House of Representatives, introduced a resolution calling for "the emancipation of slavery in the District of Columbia". It did not pass.

1846
  View of the Capital at Washington—Slavery and the Slave Trade No Right at the Nation's Capital—Slavery and the Slave Trade at the Nation's Capital by Federal Legislation—Slave Law at the Nation's Capital—Slavery and Slave Law as they are at the Nation's Capital—American Freemen, uncharged with Crime, Sold as Slaves—The Man-Trade at the Nation's Capital—Man-Auctioneering at the Nation's Capital—Shame of the National Man-Trade—Horrors of the National Man-Trade—Help for the Nation's Pauper—Auxiliary Guard to Catch SlavesLiberty Party—Demand for the Liberty Party—How the Liberty Party can effect its Object

1848
 
 As reported in The North Star of May 12, 1848, Senator John P. Hale wished to introduce a bill, making "any city, town, or corporate place" in the District liable for damages done by mobs.

1849

1850
 Senator Henry Clay made a lengthy speech in Congress, in February of 1850, on the question of slavery in the District.
 

The only vote for his bill was his own.
 

 a bill    liberator oct 11 1850 p. 2

1851
  Chaplin was arrested in August 1850 for having "abducted, stolen, taken, and carried out from the city of Washington" two fugitive slaves. Additional charges were brought against him for assaulting his arrestors. The Chaplin Fund Committee was organized to raise money for his bail and defense.

1860
 
 
 According to Wendell Phillips, if Abe Lincoln is elected president, "those four years will be wasted. He will waste them in trying to make up his mind on the abolition of slavery in the District of Columbia."

1862
 
"The second Section, the old Maryland laws in regard to Slavery, in force in the District of Columbia at the time of its cession by Maryland to the Federal Government, and by Congress continued in force by Act 27th the said district, shall ever be construed so as to prohibit the owers of slaves to hire them within, or remove them to the said district, in the same way as was practiced prior to the February, 1801, section 1.—(2 Statutes, 103.)" p. 2
pp. 3–4 No part of the laws of Virginia or Maryland declared by an act of Congress passed the 27th day of February, 1801, “concerning the District of Columbia,” to be in force within

 
 

 
 

 April 3 vote in the Senate: https://www.newspapers.com/image/78343983/ col. 2

1864

1872

1884 and later
   mention Reuben Crandall trial

D.C. slave records released for 150th emancipation anniversary http://www.shfwire.com/dc-slave-records-released-150th-emancipation-anniversary

https://emancipation.dc.gov/page/history-emancipation-day D.C. Emancipation Day

https://commons.wikimedia.org/wiki/Category:Harper%27s_Weekly,_1866#/media/File:Celebration_of_the_abolition_of_slavery_in_the_District_of_Columbia_by_the_colored_people,_in_Washington,_April_19,_1866_Henry_A._Smythe,_Esq._-_-_Sketched_by_F._Dielman._LCCN2015647679.tif

Index in category United States Presidents and slavery

External links

 
Abolitionism in the United States
DC